United States Strategic Command is a unified combatant command of the United States.

Strategic Command may also refer to:

Strategic Command (United Kingdom)
Strategic Command (film), 1997 
Strategic Command (video game series)
Strategic Command: European Theater, 2002
Strategic Command 2: Blitzkrieg, 2006
Strategic Command WWII Pacific Theater, 2008
Strategic Command WWII Global Conflict, 2010

See also